Costuleni  may refer to:

Geography 
Two border towns along the Prut River (and united from 1922 to 1940):
Costuleni, Iași, a commune in Iaşi County, Romania
Costuleni, Ungheni, a commune in Ungheni district, Moldova

Football 
FC Costuleni, a Moldovan football team